The 20907/20908 Sayaji Nagari Express is a Superfast train belonging to Indian Railways that runs between  and . It operates as train number 20907 from Dadar to Bhuj and as train number 20908 in the reverse direction. It is a daily service.

Coaches

The Sayajinagari Express has 1 AC 1st Class, 2 AC 2 tier, 6 AC 3 tier, 8 Sleeper class, 3 General unreserved and 2 EOG cum sleeper & luggage. As with most train services in India, coach composition may be amended at the discretion of Indian Railways depending on demand.

Service

The Sayajinagri Express covers the distance of 839 km in 15 hours 15 mins as 20907 Sayajinagri Express averaging 55 km/hr & 15 hours 15 mins as 20908 Sayajinagri Express averaging 55 km/hr. As the average speed of the train in both directions is 55 km/hr.

It is one of 2 daily trains between Mumbai & Bhuj, the other being Kutch Express. It has 29 halts as opposed to 22 halts for Kutch Express.

Route & halts
They important halts of the train are:

Schedule

Traction
Bhuj, and vice versa

Images

References 

Transport in Bhuj
Named passenger trains of India
Transport in Mumbai
Rail transport in Gujarat
Transport in Kutch district
Rail transport in Maharashtra
Express trains in India